The 1956–57 season was the 55th in the history of the Western Football League.

The champions for the first time in their history were Poole Town, and the winners of Division Two were Cinderford Town.

Division One
Division One was increased from seventeen to nineteen clubs after no clubs were relegated the previous season. Two clubs joined:

Taunton Town, runners-up in Division Two
Torquay United Reserves, champions of Division Two

Division Two
Division Two was reduced from twenty to eighteen clubs after Taunton Town and Torquay United Reserves were promoted to Division One, Chippenham Town Reserves and Frome Town Reserves left the league, and no clubs were relegated from Division One. Two new clubs joined:

Bath City Reserves, rejoining the league after leaving Division One in 1955.
Dorchester Town Reserves

References

1956-57
4